Amalthea Cellars is a winery in the West Atco section of Winslow in Camden County, New Jersey. The vineyard was first planted in 1976, and opened to the public in 1981. Amalthea has 10 acres of grapes under cultivation, and produces 5,000 cases of wine per year. The winery is named after Amalthea, a moon of Jupiter, reflecting the owner's scientific background and love of mythology.

Wines
Amalthea Cellars is in the Outer Coastal Plain AVA, and produces wine from Cabernet Franc, Cabernet Sauvignon, Chancellor, Chardonnay, Dolcetto, Merlot, Pinot gris, Rayon d'Or, Riesling, Rkatsiteli, Sauvignon blanc, Syrah, Traminette, Villard blanc, and Viognier grapes. Amalthea also makes fruit wines from blueberries and peaches. It is the only winery in New Jersey that produces wine from Rayon d'Or, which is a white hybrid grape developed in France in the early twentieth century. Amalthea was a participant at the Judgment of Princeton, a wine tasting organized by the American Association of Wine Economists that compared New Jersey wines to premium French vintages.

Advocacy, licensing, and associations
The winery advocates traditional winemaking techniques, and uses egg whites, sulfur, and oak barrels to produce its wine. Amalthea has a plenary winery license from the New Jersey Division of Alcoholic Beverage Control, which allows it to produce an unrestricted amount of wine, operate up to 15 off-premises sales rooms, and ship up to 12 cases per year to consumers in-state or out-of-state. Amalthea is a member of the Garden State Wine Growers Association and the Outer Coastal Plain Vineyard Association.

See also
 Alcohol laws of New Jersey
 American wine
 Judgment of Princeton
 List of wineries, breweries, and distilleries in New Jersey
 New Jersey Farm Winery Act
 New Jersey Wine Industry Advisory Council
 New Jersey wine

References

External links 
 Garden State Wine Growers Association
 Outer Coastal Plain Vineyard Association
 Amalthea Cellars home page

Wineries in New Jersey
Tourist attractions in Camden County, New Jersey
1981 establishments in New Jersey
Waterford Township, New Jersey